Dean Hawkes is a British architect and award-winning academic. Born in 1938 he studied at Regional College of Art, Manchester and Clare College, University of Cambridge. His career combined practice, teaching and research:

From 1965 – 1995 he taught and researched at the Department of Architecture at Cambridge University, where he was a founder member and, later, Director of the Martin Centre for Architectural and Urban Studies.  He held the Chair of Architectural Design at the Welsh School of Architecture, Cardiff University from 1995 – 2002.  He has held visiting professorships at the Chinese University of Hong Kong, the National University of Singapore, the Mackintosh School of Architecture, Glasgow School of Art, the Department of Architecture, Huddersfield University and the Leicester School of Architecture, De Montfort University.  He is emeritus professor at Cardiff University and an emeritus fellow of Darwin College, University of Cambridge.

Dean Hawkes was in practice with Stephen Greenberg as Greenberg and Hawkes.  Projects were widely published and won a number of RIBA Architecture Awards.  They were exhibited at the Royal Academy of Arts, London and at the Venice Biennale.

He has published numerous books and essays on architecture and contributed to many journals, including the Architects' Journal and the Architectural Review.

Awards 
In 2000 Dean Hawkes received the international PLEA Award in recognition of his contribution to teaching, practice and research in the field of passive, low-energy architecture.
In 2010 Dean Hawkes was awarded the Royal Institute of British Architects (RIBA) Annie Spink Award for architectural education. The honour is awarded by the RIBA biannually to those who have made a significant contribution to architectural education. He was described by the chair of the judging panel as "one of the most pre-eminent thinkers in architectural education" who had "an exceptional commitment to the environmental agenda from a time when this was not fashionable or mainstream thinking". In December 2016 Dean Hawkes was awarded an honorary Doctorate of Letters by the University of Westminster, London.

Key Publications 

 D. Hawkes, J. Owers [1982] The Architecture of Energy, Longman, London.
 Dean Hawkes (1986) Modern Country Homes in England, Cambridge University Press, Cambridge.  Paperback edition, (2011).
 Dean Hawkes [1995] The Environmental Tradition, Spon Press, London.
 Dean Hawkes, Jane McDonald, and Koen Steemers, [2001] The Selective Environment: An Approach to Environmentally Responsive Architecture, Taylor & Francis, London.
 D. Hawkes, Arup Partnership, W. Forster [2002] Energy Efficient Buildings: Architecture, Engineering, and Environment, W. W. Norton & Company, London.
 Dean Hawkes [2008] The Environmental Imagination, Spon Press, London.
 Dean Hawkes (2012) Architecture and Climate, Routledge, London.
 Dean Hawkes (2019) The Environmental Imagination, 2nd Edition, Routledge, London.
 Dean Hawkes  (2021)  The Architect and the Academy, Routledge, London.

Key Buildings 
 House and Studio, Doughty Mews, Bloomsbury, London.
 House, Cambridge.
 House, Dorset.
 Library, Maldon, Essex.
 Principal's Lodge, Newnham College, Cambridge.

References

External links 
 The Architect and the Academy lecture

British architects
Living people
Architecture academics
Fellows of Darwin College, Cambridge
1938 births